Braylon Jamel Edwards (born February 21, 1983) is an American former professional football player who was a wide receiver in the National Football League (NFL). He played college football for the University of Michigan, earned unanimous All-American honors, and was recognized as the top college wide receiver.  He was also the first receiver in Big Ten Conference history to record three consecutive 1,000-yard seasons and only the third to do so in NCAA Division I-A.  He was selected by the Cleveland Browns with the third overall pick in the 2005 NFL Draft. He also played for the New York Jets, San Francisco 49ers and Seattle Seahawks.

Early years
Edwards was born in Detroit, Michigan. During his three active high school years at Bishop Gallagher High School, Edwards played a variety of positions for his high school football team, and made 63 receptions for 740 yards and eight touchdowns.  At the MHSAA track and field championships in 2001, he was defeated and had to settle for second in the High Jump to Mike Baysdell, who bested his 6'8" effort with a 6'9" jump.

College career
Edwards attended the University of Michigan, following in his father Stan Edwards's footsteps, where he played for coach Lloyd Carr's Michigan Wolverines football team from 2001 to 2004.  During his senior season in 2004, he set Michigan season records for receptions (97) and receiving yards (1,330), and career records with 252 receptions, 3,541 yards, and 39 touchdowns, a Big Ten record.  Edwards also set the Michigan career record for the most games with 100 or more receiving yards (17). During the 2013 Buffalo Wild Wings Bowl, Jeremy Gallon eclipsed Edwards' school single-season receiving yardage record with a total of 1373.

Following his senior season, he won the Fred Biletnikoff Award given to the nation's top receiver, was awarded the Chicago Tribune Silver Football as the Big Ten Conference's most valuable player, and was recognized as a unanimous first-team All-American.

Edwards is the only wide receiver in Big Ten history and the third in NCAA Division I-A annals to gain 1,000 or more receiving yards in three consecutive years. Edwards concluded his college career by recording three touchdown catches in the 2005 Rose Bowl against the Texas Longhorns, tying the Rose Bowl record.  Edwards also fell just short of eclipsing Jack Clancy's 10-game single-season records of 76 receptions and 1,077 yards by recording 76 and 1,049 in his first 10 in 2004.

College statistics

Track and field
Braylon Edwards also ran track and field at Michigan. His indoor 200 meter time of 21.81 seconds was the third fastest in school history at that time. Edwards also ran the 60-meter dash and the 100-meter dash. He placed third in the high jump at the 2003 Meyo Invitational, with a personal-best leap of 2.11 meters.

Personal bests

Professional career

2005 NFL Draft
Edwards was selected in the first round (3rd overall) in the 2005 NFL Draft by the Cleveland Browns.

Cleveland Browns

Edwards began his rookie season as Cleveland's third wide receiver – a hold-out caused him to miss the beginning of training camp. Early in the season Edwards revealed that he had a staph infection, and missed a few weeks as a result of it. He moved into the starting lineup by midseason. He made his NFL debut versus the Cincinnati Bengals on September 11 and caught his first NFL touchdown at the Green Bay Packers on September 18. He amassed 512 receiving yards and three touchdowns before suffering a season ending knee injury. Edwards had surgery in the offseason, and, while rehabilitating, bonded with Kellen Winslow II. Both were determined to make a full and speedy recovery.

Edwards, like Winslow, had a successful rehabilitation that enabled him to be ready to play in the team's opening game in 2006. Edwards became the top receiver for the Browns after an injury to Joe Jurevicius that season. Edwards totaled 61 receptions for 884 yards and six touchdowns on the season. At the end of the season, Edwards announced he would give $500,000 to the University of Michigan for a scholarship endowment for football players. Edwards also had an altercation with Charlie Frye on the sidelines of a game in 2006. He said "and they're talking about video games." Edwards continued to make headlines that season when he called out Mike Minter, Chris Gamble, Ricky Manning and other defensive backs of the Carolina Panthers. Additionally, he attended the annual Michigan-Ohio State rivalry game after being advised not to go by several veteran captains. Edwards was late getting back from Columbus and was late to a team meeting.

Edwards had a breakout season in 2007 and made his first Pro Bowl, becoming the first Browns receiver to make the Pro Bowl since Webster Slaughter in 1989. Edwards broke franchise records for receiving yardage with 1,289 receiving yards compared to Slaughter's record of 1,236 in 1989 and receiving touchdowns with 16 compared to Gary Collins's 13 in 1963. Edwards' 16 touchdowns was also second in the league behind only Randy Moss who set an NFL record with 23 touchdowns.

Edwards publicly made a bet with Michael Phelps that he would catch 17 touchdowns in 2008. However, Edwards and the Browns struggled during the entire year. The Browns finished at 4–12, and Braylon led the NFL in dropped passes with 23. He caught only three touchdown passes.

New York Jets

On October 7, 2009, Edwards was traded to the New York Jets for wide receiver Chansi Stuckey, linebacker Jason Trusnik and a third and fifth round draft pick in the 2010 NFL Draft. Edwards cited a need for a "fresh start" following the deal's completion. In 12 games for New York, Braylon had 35 catches for 541 yards and four touchdowns. Braylon had his first taste of the post-season in the 2009–10 NFL playoffs. In the Jets first two games, Braylon only had 4 catches for 56 yards but in the AFC Championship against the Indianapolis Colts, Braylon caught an 80-yard touchdown pass to give the Jets their first points of the game. He finished the game with 2 catches for 100 yards and a touchdown as the Jets lost 30-17.

Edwards remained with the New York Jets in 2010, catching 53 passes for 904 yards and 7 touchdowns.

San Francisco 49ers
On August 4, 2011, Edwards signed a one-year contract worth $1 million with the San Francisco 49ers. The contract would have increased to $3.5 million had Edwards recorded a 90-yard-catch or Pro Bowl season. He started five games and was waived by the 49ers on December 27 without having achieved either incentive.

Seattle Seahawks
On July 31, 2012, Edwards signed a one-year deal with the Seattle Seahawks. On December 4, 2012, he was waived by the Seahawks.

Second stint with the Jets
Edwards was claimed off waivers by the New York Jets on December 11, 2012. On July 25, 2013, Edwards signed a one-year deal with the Jets for the 2013 season. He was waived on August 26, 2013.

NFL career statistics

Legal issues
Edwards was stopped at least seven times from 2002 to 2010 for speeding violations, the most recent of which was in October 2008 when he was pulled over for driving 120 mph in a 65 mph zone.

Two days before being traded to the New York Jets, on October 5, 2009, Edwards reportedly punched Edward Givens, a local party promoter, in the face at 2:30 A.M. outside of the View Ultralounge & Nightclub. Givens, who is an acquaintance of LeBron James, alleged that Edwards was jealous of James' success thus prompting Edwards' attack. This prompted James to call the incident "childish." On October 26, 2009, Edwards was charged with misdemeanor assault and later pleaded no contest to the charge of aggravated assault on January 12, 2010. Edwards was given a suspended 180-day jail sentence, was fined $1,000 and placed on inactive probation. Though Edwards offered no explanation or apology for his actions, he reportedly regretted the entire ordeal according to his lawyer. The NFL did not suspend Edwards for his actions.

On September 21, 2010, Edwards was arrested on a drunken driving charge in New York early in the morning.  He was originally pulled over for having excessively tinted windows on his Range Rover. Police smelled alcohol on Edwards who blew 0.16—twice the legal limit. He was arrested on a DUI charge.

In October 2013, Braylon was accused of physically assaulting a man who had taken a video of Edwards fighting in the street earlier in the evening with an unknown man. The photographer said he was approached by Edwards who demanded the video be deleted and when the photographer refused and started to walk away, Braylon grabbed the photographers ankles from behind and lifted them up, causing the photographer's face to strike the pavement and then followed up by slamming him into the side of a car on the street.  When approached by the media Braylon Edwards' representatives denied the incident, claiming the story was concocted in a shameless attempt to "take Braylon's money."

The next day TMZ presented video footage showing the incident taking place as the victim had described.

Philanthropy
In 2007, Edwards pledged to 100 Cleveland high school students that, if they maintained grade point averages at 2.5 or higher and performed 15 hours of community service, he would pay for their college tuition, an offer valued at $1 million. On May 25, 2011, it was widely reported that Edwards announced he was keeping his pledge. Sporting News website quoted Edwards as saying:

As the 2nd most hated man in Clev & a man of my word, today I will honor a promise made to 100 students in Cleveland years ago," Edwards tweeted. "The last of my Advance 100 students will graduate from my program and head off to college on scholarships that I will provide them with. Guys, enjoy and embrace your new beginnings and remember your promise to me, to reach back & help someone else along the way.Ex-Michigan WR Braylon Edwards keeps promise, pays for 100 students to attend college Detroit Free Press. May 26, 2011. Retrieved May 27, 2011.

The scholarships are worth $10,000 each and fulfill a promise Edwards made to 100 eighth-graders in the Cleveland area in 2007 as long as they continued to meet the academic and community service requirements. According to published reports, Edwards actually selected 101 students. In an interview Edwards said: 101 Scholarships at $10,000 each is $1.01M.

This was not a tax write-off. This was something we wanted to do the right way and something I was going to be a part of until the end. I know that some of these kids could have easily steered off the right path or maybe wouldn't have been able to go to college at all without this, and I just hope someday they pay it forward.

The pledge was through a program called the "ADVANCE 100 Program", an educational initiative established by the Braylon Edwards Foundation in May 2007.

Television football analyst
Edwards started working for the Big 10 Television Network in the summer of 2017. On September 3, 2018, he was suspended for comments in violation of their media guidelines after he tweeted "Ruiz is weak, line is weak, Shea is scared, fucking Michigan offense is so predictable. Michigan football is sadly one thing……Trash." Edwards had a longstanding feud with Michigan coach Jim Harbaugh which intensified after the Notre Dame game at the beginning of the 2018 season.

Edwards is, as of 2022, working with Woodward Sports Network.

See also
 Lists of Michigan Wolverines football receiving leaders

References

External links
 
 New York Jets profile

1983 births
Living people
American football wide receivers
Cleveland Browns players
Michigan Wolverines football players
Michigan Wolverines men's track and field athletes
New York Jets players
San Francisco 49ers players
Seattle Seahawks players
All-American college football players
American Conference Pro Bowl players
Players of American football from Detroit
African-American players of American football
20th-century African-American people
21st-century African-American sportspeople